The National security of China is the coordination of a variety of organizations, including law enforcement, military, paramilitary, governmental, and intelligence agencies that aim to ensure China's national security. China considers three factors in its national security: national sovereignty, security, and development interests.

Armed forces overview 

The collective armed forces of China are officially known as the People's Liberation Army (PLA). The ground forces are referred to simply as the PLA; the navy is called the PLA Navy and the air force is known as the PLA Air Force. The PLA's independent strategic missile forces are typically referred to as the PLA Rocket Force.

The Chinese Communist Party (CCP) Central Military Commission (CMC) is responsible for creating PLA policy. The CMC is led by the Chairman, who serves as the commander-in-chief of the PLA. The commission has two to three vice chairmen, each of whom is a general in the PLA ground forces, and seven other members representing other various branches of the PLA. Operational control of the PLA is administered by the CCP Central Military Commission and the Ministry of National Defense. The PLA headquarters are categorized into four departments: General Staff Department, General Political Department, General Logistics Department and General Armaments Department.

In 2005, China announced that it had downsized its military by 200,000 troops in order to optimize force structures and increase combat capabilities. The number of active-duty soldiers decreased to 2.3 million from as high as 3.2 million in 1987. The changes included eliminating layers in the command hierarchy, reducing non-combat units, such as schools and farms, and reprogramming officer duties. The ground forces were reduced in numbers, while the navy, air force, and rocket forces were strengthened. Currently, an estimated 1.7 million military personnel are in the ground forces, 250,000 in the navy (including 26,000 naval aviation personnel, 10,000 marines, and 28,000 coastal defense forces), 400,000 to 420,000 in the air force, and 90,000 to 100,000 in the strategic missile forces. Reservists number an estimated 500,000 to 600,000 and paramilitary forces in the People's Armed Police number an estimated 1.5 million.

The Central Military Commission of the People's Republic of China is differentiated from the Central Military Commission of the CCP. According to Article 93 of the state constitution, the Central Military Commission directs the armed forces of the country and is composed of a chairman, vice chairmen, and members whose terms run concurrently with the National People's Congress. The commission is responsible to the National People's Congress and its Standing Committee.

Foreign military relations 
In 2008, China sold US$645 million worth of arms and military equipment to a variety of nations. By 2018, China had increased its arms exports to $1.04 billion, making it the world's fifth-largest arms supplier behind the United States, Russia, Germany and France. Its clients include Algeria, Egypt, Iran, Kuwait, Pakistan, Bangladesh, Myanmar and Yemen. China also provides military assistance to other countries, such as Fiji, Papua New Guinea, Tonga and Vanuatu. The China North Industries Group Corporation (CNGC, often called NORINCO), China's main defense manufacturer, has more than 100 joint ventures and more than 80 overseas offices and branches in 30 countries and regions involved in military and dual-use technology production and sales. China is also a major arms buyer, mainly purchasing naval and air force equipment from Russia. In 2004, China gave unprecedented access to senior foreign military officers at a military demonstration in Henan Province. Officers from 15 Asian nations and Russia were present. In 2005, China and Russia held joint eight-day "Peace Mission 2005" military maneuvers near Vladivostok, Shandong, and the surrounding waters; air, land, and amphibious exercises were held.

China is a member of the Shanghai Cooperation Organisation (SCO) along with Russia, Kazakhstan, Kyrgyzstan, Tajikistan, India, Pakistan, and Uzbekistan. The SCO was first called the Shanghai Five and was established in 1996 when the member nations signed agreements to strengthen mutual trust in military fields and border areas. The partnership was further strengthened in 1997 when the nations agreed to mutual reduction of military forces in border areas. After the September 11, 2001, terrorist attacks on the United States and the entry of US and North Atlantic Treaty Organization (NATO) forces into Central Asia, the SCO was formed and members began to hold joint counterterrorism military exercises. In 2004 the SCO initiated a regional antiterrorism structure to crack down on various transnational terrorist and criminal activities. China also has held joint naval and counterterrorism exercises with Pakistan. The naval exercise, which occurred in the East China Sea, was the first such drill with a foreign counterpart, as Chinese sources put it, "in a non-traditional security field". The anti-terrorism exercise, which was held in Xinjiang Uygur Autonomous Region, involved border guards from both sides.

External threat 
Even while embroiled in the problems of territorial disputes with its neighbors and the dangers of periodic tensions on the Korean Peninsula and across the Taiwan Strait, China perceives the United States as its greatest threat. Beijing believes that the US maintains its Cold War policy toward China and the Asia-Pacific region and stresses ideological differences and their relationship to security issues of concern in the region. In China's view, Washington's attitude exacerbates tensions, which, in turn, lead to international turmoil. Post-Soviet Russia is now fairly benign in China's view, and relations have improved significantly from the days of border conflicts and high-level tension. Concerns about the remilitarization of Japan also resurface on occasion, often as a legacy of World War II enmity. Transnational crime, terrorism, separatism, and contradictions among nations all contribute to China's security concerns.

Defense budget 

Although China claims that the share of defense spending as a percentage of the overall state budget has declined from 17.4 percent in 1979 to 9.5 percent in 1994 and 7.7 percent in 2004, the government has announced double-digit increases in military spending nearly every year for more than a decade. The defense budget for 2006 is expected to reach US$35.1 billion, the largest increase in four years and 16 percent higher than 2005 (estimated at US$29.5 billion). The report submitted in March 2006 at the Fourth Session of the 10th National People's Congress (NPC) contained a request for a budget increase to strengthen China's defensive capability and ability to respond to emergencies and to raise officer and enlisted pay levels. The NPC stated that China's military spending is still low compared to the United States, United Kingdom, France, Germany, and Japan. However, the actual defense budget is likely to be higher than expected because of the inclusion of defense-related items in non-defense budgets.

Major military units 
The ground forces are organized into seven military regions (headquartered in Shenyang in the northeast, Beijing in the north, Lanzhou in the west, Chengdu in the southwest, Guangzhou in the south, Jinan in central China, and Nanjing in the east), 28 provincial military districts, four centrally controlled garrison commands (coinciding with the centrally administered municipalities of Beijing, Tianjin, Shanghai, and Chongqing), and 21 integrated group armies. The group armies have between 30,000 and 65,000 troops, typically comprising two to three infantry divisions, one armored division or brigade, one artillery division or brigade, and one joint surface-to-air missile or anti-aircraft artillery brigade or simply an antiaircraft artillery brigade.

The navy is organized into North Sea (headquartered at Qingdao, Shandong Province), East Sea (headquartered at Ningbo, Zhejiang Province) and South Sea (headquartered at Zhanjiang, Guangdong Province) fleets. Each fleet has destroyer, submarine, coastal patrol flotillas and naval air stations. There are numerous major naval bases: the North Sea Fleet has seven, the East Sea Fleet eight, and the South Sea Fleet sixteen.

The air force has 5 air corps and 32 air divisions. The major air force headquarters coincide with the seven military regions. The air force has more than 140 air bases and airfields, including ready access to China's major regional and international airports.

The strategic missile forces, or Second Artillery Corps, are organized into seven missile divisions based in the military regions, with the central headquarters at Qinghe, north of Beijing. There also are training and testing bases. The six operational bases have 21 launch brigades as of 2005.

Major military equipment 
The major ground forces equipment includes an estimated 7,000 main battle tanks, 1,200 light tanks, 5,000 armored personnel carriers, 14,000 pieces of towed artillery, 1,700 pieces of self-propelled artillery, 2,400 multiple rocket launchers, 7,700 air defense guns, 6,500 anti-tank guided weapons, and unspecified numbers of mortars, surface-to-surface and surface-to-air missiles, recoilless rifles, rocket launchers, and anti-tank guns. The ground forces also have an estimated 321 helicopters and an unspecified number of unmanned air vehicles and surveillance aircraft.

Among the navy's principal combatant ships are 68 submarines (many of which are slated for decommissioning in the mid-2000s). One is a Xia class submarine-launched ballistic missile (SSBN) force strategic-capability submarine. There are plans for more advanced SSBNs by the end of the decade. The navy also has an estimated 21 destroyers and 42 frigates, as well as 368 fast-attack craft, 39 mine warfare ships, 10 hovercraft, 6 troop transports, 19 landing-ship/tank ships, 37 medium landing ships, 45 utility landing craft, 10 air-cushioned landing craft, 163 support and miscellaneous craft, 8 submarine support ships, 4 salvage and repair ships, 29 supply ships, 1 multirole aviation ship, and about 700 land-based combat aircraft and 45 armed helicopters. China also has plans to launch a 40,000-ton aircraft carrier by 2010.

The air force has some 1,900 combat aircraft, including armed helicopters. The inventory includes 180 bombers, more than 950 fighters and 838 ground attack fighters, an estimated 290 reconnaissance/electronic intelligence aircraft, an estimated 513 transports, an estimated 170 helicopters, some 200 training aircraft, and an unmanned aerial vehicle. Weapons include air-to-air missiles and ground-based air defense artillery using surface-to-air missiles and antiaircraft artillery.

The strategic missile forces have in their inventory 20 or more intercontinental ballistic missiles (ICBMs), between 130 and 150 intermediate-range ballistic missiles, one Xia class submarine carrying 12 submarine-launched ballistic missiles, and about 335 or more short-range ballistic missiles.

Military service 
There is selective conscription of two years for all the services starting at age 18 for males. In 2004 there were some 136,000 women in the armed forces.

Paramilitary forces 

The principal paramilitary organization of China is the People's Armed Police Force. There are militia forces of indeterminate strength under the control of the CCP. Once a critical part of Mao Zedong's "people's war" strategy, militia units are no longer an essential part of China's military and have mostly disbanded.

Military forces abroad 
In 2004 China deployed 95 riot police officers as part of a 125-member unit to Haiti for the United Nations Stabilization Mission in Haiti, a nation with which Beijing does not have diplomatic relations. As of that time, China had deployed 297 peacekeepers to five other nations, including East Timor, Bosnia-Herzegovina, Liberia, Afghanistan, and Kosovo. China has also sent peacekeeping observers to Ethiopia and Eritrea, various Middle Eastern countries, the Democratic Republic of the Congo, Sierra Leone, and Western Sahara. It is a formal participant in the UN Mission for the Referendum in Western Sahara, the UN Organization Stabilization Mission in the Democratic Republic of the Congo (MONUSCO), the UN Mission in Sierra Leone, the UN Mission in Ethiopia and Eritrea, and the UN Mission in Liberia.

Police and internal security 
China's internal security apparatus is made up of the Ministry of State Security (MSS) and the Ministry of Public Security (MPS), the People's Armed Police, the People's Liberation Army (PLA), and the state judicial, procuratorial, and penal systems. The Ministry of Public Security oversees all domestic police activity in China, including the People's Armed Police Force. The ministry is responsible for police operations and prisons and has dedicated departments for internal political, economic, and communications security. Its lowest organizational units are public security stations, which maintain close day-to-day contact with the public. The People's Armed Police Force, which sustains an estimated total strength of 1.5 million personnel, is organized into 45 divisions: internal security police, border defense personnel, guards for government buildings and embassies, and police communications specialists.

The Ministry of State Security was established in 1983 to ensure "the security of the state through effective measures against enemy agents, spies, and counterrevolutionary activities designed to sabotage or overthrow China's socialist system." The ministry is guided by a series of laws enacted in 1993, 1994, and 1997 that replaced the "counter-revolutionary” crime statutes. The ministry's operations include intelligence collection, both domestic and foreign.

China has developed an efficient, well-funded internal security apparatus which is tasked with stability maintenance, or "weiwen". According to a study conducted by Tsinghua University, based on published police budgets, $77 billion, (514 billion yuan) was appropriated for internal security in 2009, a budget item which is rapidly increasing.

Internal threat and terrorism 

Muslim separatists in the Xinjiang Uyghur Autonomous Region present China with its most significant terrorist threat, which emerged in the late 1980s. In 2003, Beijing published "East Turkistan Terrorist List", which labeled organizations such as the World Youth Uyghur Congress and the East Turkestan Information Center as terrorist entities. These groups openly advocate for the independence and formation of East Turkestan. Although they have not been publicly linked to violent activity, the separatists have engaged in violence, bomb attacks, assassinations, and street fighting, which Beijing responded to with police and military action.

During the summer of 2004, elite troops from China and Pakistan held joint anti-terrorism exercises in Xinjiang that were aimed at the East Turkistan Islamic Movement, an organization listed as terrorist by China, the US, and the UN. This and other Uyghur separatist groups were trained in Afghanistan to fight with the Taliban and al Qaeda. The East Turkistan Islamic Movement was established in 1990 and has links to the Islamic Movement of Uzbekistan, which operates throughout Central Asia. Premier Wen Jiabao joined leaders of other Asian and European nations in Hanoi for the October 2004 Asia–Europe Meeting (ASEM), where the delegates reaffirmed their call for a War on Terrorism led by the UN.

Hong Kong 

The Hong Kong Special Administrative Region is considered a part of China, so it has a responsibility to protect national security of China. In Hong Kong, national security law (to fulfill Hong Kong Basic Law Article 23) has not been passed yet. It was attempted in 2003 but withdrawn due to mass demonstrations. Since the major social movements in 2014 and 2019–20, the Central Government of China has had concerns about national security, and has highlighted foreign forces interfering in domestic affairs. The Chinese Government has pressured Hong Kong to enact national security laws many times. Since some Hong Kong legislators refuse to pass any bills related to China, it is unlikely that a national security law will be passed in the foreseeable future. To block the national security loophole in Hong Kong, in 2020, China's National People's Congress passed a National Security Law for Hong Kong which bypasses Hong Kong's local legislation.

Macau 
The Macau Special Administrative Region is considered a part of China, so it has the responsibility to protect the national security of China. A Macau national security law was passed in 2009.

See also
Law enforcement in China
Public safety network

References

Government of China
Military of the People's Republic of China
China